Silesians (Silesian German: Schläsinger or Schläsier; ;) is a geographical term for the inhabitants of Silesia, a historical region in Central Europe divided by the current national boundaries of Poland, Germany, and the Czech Republic. Historically, the region of Silesia (Lower and Upper) has been inhabited by Germans (German speakers), Czechs, Poles, and Slavic Upper Silesians. Therefore, the term Silesian can refer to anyone of these ethnic groups. However, in 1945, great demographic changes occurred in the region as a result of the Potsdam Agreement leaving most of the region ethnically Polish and/or Slavic Upper Silesian.

There have been some debates on whether or not the Silesians (historically, Upper Silesians) constitute a distinct nation. In modern history, they have often been pressured to declare themselves to be German, Polish or Czech, and use the language of the nation which was in control of Silesia. Nevertheless, 847,000 people declared themselves to be of Silesian nationality in the 2011 Polish national census (including 376,000 who declared it to be their only nationality, 436,000 who declared to be their first nationality, 411,000 who declared to be their second one, and 431,000 who declared joint Silesian and Polish nationality), making them the largest minority group. About 126,000 people declared themselves as members of the German minority (58,000 declared it jointly with Polish nationality), making it the third largest minority group in the country (93% of Germans living in Poland are in the Polish part of Silesia). 31,301 people declared Silesian nationality in the Czech national census of 2021, including 18,850 of those who declared two nationalities (44,446 in Czechoslovakia in 1991), and 6,361 people declared joint Silesian and Moravian nationality in the Slovak national census.

During the German occupation of Poland, Nazi authorities conducted a census in East Upper Silesia in 1940. At the time, 157,057 people declared Silesian nationality (Slonzaken Volk), and the Silesian language was declared by 288,445 people. However, the Silesian nationality could only be declared in the Cieszyn part of the region. Approximately 400–500,000 respondents from the other areas of East Upper Silesia who declared "Upper Silesian nationality" (Oberschlesier) were assigned to the German nationality category. After World War II in Poland, the 1945 census showed a sizable group of people in Upper Silesia who declared Silesian nationality. According to police reports, 22% of people in Zabrze considered themselves to be Silesians, and that number was around 50% in Strzelce County.

History
Archaeological findings of the 20th century in Silesia confirm the existence of an early settlement inhabited by Celtic tribes.

Until the 2nd century some parts of Silesia were populated by Celtic Boii, predecessors of the states of Bohemia and Bavaria and subsequently until the 5th century, by the Germanic Silingi, a tribe of the Vandals, which moved south and west to invade Andalusia. Silesia remained depopulated until the second phase of the migration period.

The Slavs, predominantly White Croats entered the depopulated territory of Silesia in the first half of the 6th century. The Slavic territories were mostly abandoned, because the Celtic and Germanic tribes that lived there before had moved west. Chronologically, the first group of Slavs were those that dwelt by the Dnieper River, the second was the Sukov-Dzidzice type Slavs, and the last were groups of Avaro-Slavic peoples from the Danube river areas. In the early 9th century, the settlement stabilized. Local West Slavs began to erect a series of defensive systems, such as the Silesian Przesieka and the Silesia Walls to guard them from invaders. The north-eastern border with Western Polans was not reinforced, due to their common culture and language.

The 9th-century Bavarian Geographer records the tribal names of the Opolanie, Dadosesani, Golenzizi, Lupiglaa, and the Ślężanie. The 1086 Prague Document, which is believed to document the 10th-century settlements, also mentions the Bobrzanie and Trzebowianie tribes. Later sources classified those tribes as Silesian tribes, which were also jointly classified as part of Polish tribes. The reason for this classification was the "fundamentally common culture and language" of Silesian, Polan, Masovian, Vistulan and Pomeranian tribes that "were considerably more closely related to one another than were the Germanic tribes."

According to Perspectives on Ethnicity, written by anthropologist V. I. Kozlov and edited by R. Holloman, the Silesian tribes, together with other Polish tribes, formed what is now Polish ethnicity and culture. This process is called ethnic consolidation, in which several ethnic communities of the same origin and cognate languages merge into one.

Middle Ages
The Silesians lived on the territory that became part of the Great Moravia in 875. Later, in 990, the first Polish state was created by Duke Mieszko I, and then expanded by king Boleslaw I at the beginning of the 11th century. He established the Bishopric of Wrocław in Lower Silesia in the year 1000.

In the Middle Ages, Slavic tribal confederacies, and then Slavic states, dominated. Silesia was part of Great Moravia, then Kingdom of Bohemia and finally the Piast monarchy of Poland. The tribal differences started to disappear after the consolidation of Poland in the 10th and 11th centuries. The main factors of this process were the establishment of a single monarchy that ruled over all Polish tribes, as well as creation of a separate ecclesiastical organization within the boundaries of the newly established Polish state. The names of the smaller tribes disappeared from historical records, as well as the names of some prominent tribes. However, in some places, the names of the most important tribes transformed into names representing the whole region, such as Mazovians for Mazovia, and Silesians for Silesia. As a result of the fragmentation of Poland, some of those regions were again divided into smaller entities, such as the division of Silesia into Lower Silesia and Upper Silesia). However, the tribal era was already over, and these divisions reflected only political subdivisions of the Polish realm. Within Poland, from 1177 onward, Silesia was divided into many smaller duchies. In 1178, parts of the Duchy of Kraków around Bytom, Oświęcim, Chrzanów and Siewierz were transferred to the Silesian Piasts, although their population was of Vistulan and not of Silesian descent. Parts of those territories were bought by the Polish kings in the second half of the 15th century, but the Bytom area remained in the possession of the Silesian Piasts, even though it remained a part of the Diocese of Kraków. Between 1327 and 1348, the duchies of Silesia came under the suzerainty of the Crown of Bohemia, which was then passed to the Habsburg monarchy of Austria in 1526.

Beginning in the 13th century, Slavic Silesia began to be settled by Germans from various parts of Germany, including Prussia and Austria. This led to changes in the ethnic structure of the province. In the Middle Ages, various German dialects of the new settlers became widely used throughout Lower Silesia and some Upper Silesian cities. However, after the era of German colonization, the Polish language was still predominant in Upper Silesia and parts of Lower and Middle Silesia north of the Odra river. Germans usually dominated large cities, and Poles mostly lived in rural areas. This required the Prussian authorities to issue official documents in Polish, or in German and Polish. The Polish-speaking territories of Lower and Middle Silesia, commonly called the Polish side until the end of the 19th century, were mostly Germanized in the 18th and 19th centuries, except for some areas along the northeastern frontier.

Modern history
In 1742, most of Silesia was seized in the War of the Austrian Succession by King Frederick the Great of Prussia, who named himself a 'Piast prince' (he was actually a remote descendant) in his first declaration. The remainder of Silesia, known as Cieszyn Silesia, remained in the Austrian Empire. The Prussian part of Silesia constituted the Province of Silesia until 1918. Later, the province was split into the Prussian provinces of Upper and Lower Silesia. Owing to the development of education, a rebirth of Polish culture took place in the second half of the 1800s in Silesia, which was connected with the emergence of a Polish national movement of a clearly Catholic character. At the beginning of the twentieth century, the fact that Silesians were part of the Polish nation was not questioned. The language and culture of the self-declared Polish Silesians were put under the pressure of the Prussian Kulturkampf policies, which attempted to Germanize them in culture and language. The process of Germanisation was never completely successful. The cultural distance of Upper Silesians from the German population resulted in the development of Polish national awareness at the turn of the nineteenth and twentieth centuries, culminating in the pro-Polish movements at the end of World War I.

After the Silesian Uprisings, the eastern minor, but richer, part of Upper Silesia became part of the newly restored Poland; most of the land that had been ruled by the Habsburgs following the 1742 war went to Czechoslovakia, while Lower Silesia and most of Upper Silesia remained in Germany. The ethnic situation of the region became more complex as the division of Upper Silesia into Polish and German parts led to ethnic polarization. The people that lived in the western part of Upper Silesia were subject to a strong German Ostsiedlung, where those living in the eastern part of Silesia started to identify with the Polish culture and statehood.

World War II and its aftermath amplified this polarization. Three groups took shape within the Silesian population. The Polish-speaking group was the largest, while the German-speaking group, which primarily lived in central Silesia, was noticeably smaller. A third group supported separatism and an independent Silesian nation-state. The separatists were of marginal importance, finding little support among native Silesians.

The reasons for these transitions were boundary shifts and population changes that came after World War II. As a result, the vast majority of the former German Silesia, even Lower Silesia, which did not have sizeable Polish-speaking population, was incorporated into Poland, with smaller regions remaining under the control of the German Democratic Republic (which later became a part of unified Germany). Czechoslovakia obtained most of Cieszyn Silesia. Millions of Silesians, mostly of German ethnicity, were subsequently expelled, but after being sifted out from the ethnic Germans by a process of "national verification", the Silesians classified as "autochthons" by the Polish communist authorities were allowed to remain, and they were intensely polonized.

Between 1955 and 1959, under the supervision of the Red Cross, some of the remaining Silesians were able to emigrate to West and East Germany to reunite with their families there. But some had to wait for years. Until 1989, nearly 600,000 Silesians emigrated to Germany.

Between 1945 and 1949, millions of ethnic Poles from the former (pre-1939) eastern Poland (especially Lviv, Volhynia, Podolia, Vilnius, etc.) and central Poland moved into Silesia, particularly in Lower Silesia. Since the end of Communist rule in Poland, there have been calls for greater political representation for the Silesian ethnic minority. In 1997, a Katowice court of law registered the Union of People of Silesian Nationality (ZLNS) as the political representative organization of the Silesian ethnic minority, but after two months, the registration was revoked by a regional court.

According to M.E. Sharpe, Silesians inhabiting Poland are considered to belong to a Polish ethnographic group, and they speak a dialect of Polish. United States Immigration Commission also counted Silesian as one of the dialects of Polish. As a result of German influence, Silesians have been influenced by German culture. Many German and their descendants who inhabited both Lower and Upper Silesia have been displaced to Germany in 1945-47.

Language

The Slavic Silesian language (often called Upper Silesian) is spoken by the Silesian ethnic group or nationality inside Polish Upper Silesia. According to the last census in Poland (2011), some 509,000 people declared Silesian to be their native language; however, as many as 817,000 people declared themselves to be of Silesian nationality, not necessarily speaking Silesian, even though the Silesian nationality has not been recognized by Polish governments since its creation in 1945.

There is some contention over whether Silesian is a dialect or a language in its own right. Most Polish linguists consider Silesian to be a prominent regional dialect of Polish. However, many Silesians regard it to be a separate language belonging to the West Slavic branch of Slavic languages, together with Polish and other Lechitic languages, such as Upper and Lower Sorbian, Czech and Slovak. In July 2007, the Silesian language was officially recognized by the Library of Congress and SIL International. The language was attributed an ISO code: SZL. The first official dictation contest of the Silesian language took place in August 2007.

Although the German language is still spoken in Silesia, as it has a sizable minority of speakers in the Opole Voivodship in Poland, the vast majority of native speakers were expelled during or after 1945. Therefore, the number of German speakers in the region was radically and significantly decreased after World War II, even though the Germans had settled there for centuries. The Silesian German dialect is a distinct variety of East Central German, with some West Slavic influence likely caused by centuries of contact between Germans and Slavs in the region; the dialect is related to contemporary Saxon in some ways. The Silesian German dialect is often misleading referred to as Lower Silesian in the German language. The usage of this dialect appears to be decreasing, as most Silesian Germans prefer either Standard German or even Polish.

Historical data

Prussian Lower Silesia
In year 1819, the Breslau Regency had 833,253 inhabitants, the majority of whom—755,553 (90%)—were German-speakers; with a Polish-speaking minority numbering 66,500 (8%); as well as 3,900 Czechs (1%) and 7,300 Jews (1%). The Liegnitz Regency was inhabited by Germans with a small Sorbian minority.

Prussian Upper Silesia
The earliest exact census figures on ethnolinguistic or national structure (Nationalverschiedenheit) of the Prussian part of Upper Silesia, come from year 1819. The last pre-WW1 general census figures available, are from 1910 (if not including the 1911 census of school children—Sprachzählung unter den Schulkindern—which revealed a higher percent of Polish-speakers among school children than the 1910 census among the general populace). Figures (Table 1.) show that large demographic changes took place between 1819 and 1910, with the region's total population quadrupling, the percent of German-speakers increasing significantly, and that of Polish-speakers declining considerably. Also the total land area in which Polish language was spoken, as well as the land area in which it was spoken by the majority, declined between 1790 and 1890. Polish authors before 1918 estimated the number of Poles in Prussian Upper Silesia as slightly higher than according to official German censuses.

Plebiscite in Prussian Upper Silesia

In the 1921 plebiscite, 40.6% of eligible voters (people over 20 years old – a minimum age that favoured the German-speaking population, whose median age was greater than that of Polish-speakers of Upper Silesia, according to censuses of 1900–1910) decided to secede from Germany and become Polish citizens. In total, over seven hundred towns and villages voted in favour of Poland, especially in the counties of Pszczyna, Rybnik, Tarnowskie Góry, Toszek-Gliwice, Strzelce Opolskie, Bytom, Katowice, Lubliniec, Zabrze, Racibórz, Olesno, Koźle and Opole.

Historiography

See also
 Silesian upraising
 List of Silesians
 People by city in Silesia

External links

 Tomasz Kamusella. The Szlonzoks and their Language: Between Germany, Poland and Szlonzokian Nationalism
 The Silesian Museum: The Architecture of Identity

References

Slavic ethnic groups
Silesia
People from Silesia
Bohemian people
Lechites
Ethnic groups in Poland
Ethnic groups in the Czech Republic
Ethnic groups in Germany
Ethnic groups divided by international borders